The Mindyarra Maintenance Centre is an under construction railway depot to be built in Dubbo as part of the NSW TrainLink Regional Train Project.

History
In August 2017, as part of the NSW TrainLink Regional Train Project, Transport for NSW announced a new maintenance facility would be built in Dubbo adjacent to the Main Western railway line, 700 metres to the east of Dubbo railway station. In November 2020, CPB Contractors commenced construction work.

Mindyarra is a Wiradjuri word that means fix or repair. It will be the first Transport for NSW facility to use an Aboriginal name.

References

Dubbo
NSW TrainLink
Proposed rail infrastructure in Australia
Railway workshops in New South Wales